Apartment for Ladies or Nu zi gong yu  is a 1970 Hong Kong comedy film directed by Umetsugu Inoue. It was produced by Run Run Shaw of Shaw Brothers Studio.

Plot
Songstress Betty Ting Pei travels from Hong Kong to Taiwan in search of her lost younger sister where she meets the composer Yang Fan and lodges at an apartment for women only run by a man-hating landlady, Mrs. Chan, yet Mrs. Chan cannot confine the young ladies youthful vitality.

Cast
 Betty Ting - Yau Suk Man
 Lily Li - Jenny
 Teresa Ha - Lulu
 Ouyang Sha-fei - Mrs. Chan
 Alice Au Yin Ching as Ding
 Guo Man-Na - Betty
 Lee Pang-Fei - George Chan
 Wei Tzu-Yun - Tommy Chan
 Ding Sai - Laura
 Chow Ka-Lai - Nancy
 Erh Chun	...	Villager

References

External links
 HK Cinemagic entry
 
 Apartment for Ladies at hkmdb.com

1970 films
1970 comedy films
1970s Mandarin-language films
Shaw Brothers Studio films
Hong Kong comedy films
1970s Hong Kong films